Stephen Rider (born 28 April 1950) is an English sports presenter, and was the anchorman of ITV's football coverage. He anchored ITV's Formula One coverage from 2006 to 2008, and football coverage from 2006 to April 2010. He was the lead presenter for ITV's coverage of the 2011 Rugby World Cup in New Zealand. He has been ITV's main presenter for the British Touring Car Championship  since 2009. He also presented Rally Report for 5 years.

Early life, education and early career
Born in Dartford, Kent, Rider attended the John Roan Boys' Grammar School on Maze Hill in Blackheath. He began his career working for a newspaper in south-east London, followed by writing for sports news agency Hayters. Early in his career he was a sports reporter for Independent Radio News and also covered motor racing for Anglia Television who he joined full time in 1977. It was also at Anglia where he first cut his teeth as a football presenter, when in 1979 he became the presenter for Anglia's local ITV football highlights show 'Match of the Week'. He hosted the programme from the 1979-80 season until the end of weekly regional Football highlights on ITV at the end of the 1982-83 season. Later he became Head of Sport on the regional news programme About Anglia. He lived near Halesworth in Suffolk.

Broadcasting

ITV
Rider worked for both ITV Sport and Independent Television News for several years providing reports for the World of Sport programme, and reporting from the 1980 Summer Olympics. He was also a presenter for some of the golf coverage on Channel 4 and presented some live European football for ITV. In addition, he read the sports news section in ITN's Saturday late bulletins.

BBC
Rider joined BBC Sport in July 1985, taking over from Harry Carpenter on the network's Sportsnight programme, which he presented for six years. He became a familiar face on British television, presenting shows such as Grandstand, BBC Sports Personality of the Year and much of the BBC's motorsports, rugby and golf coverage.

He also anchored the channel's coverage of the University Boat Race until 2005, and every Olympic Games between 1988 and 2004. In 1996 ITV attempted to recruit Rider, when it was announced that Formula One coverage would move from the BBC to ITV. However, he chose to remain with the BBC and the ITV F1 frontman role was handed to Jim Rosenthal. His last assignment for the corporation came at the World Rowing Championships in Japan in the autumn of 2005. He was succeeded by Gary Lineker and Hazel Irvine in golf, John Inverdale for the rowing and rugby union and Clare Balding for rugby league.

Return to ITV
In September 2005 it was reported that ITV had secured Rider's services and he would replace Jim Rosenthal from 2006 onwards to present coverage of Formula One. He later said that a factor in his decision to move network was the BBC's unwillingness to agree his long-term future. He told The Times: "I went...to the BBC and said 'Look, you know me as a presenter, you know the way I work, the way I want to work, I want to make a long-term commitment to encompass 2012.' They did not feel able to do that and it was easy to make a decision [about my future] from that point on". In March 2006 Rider made his coverage debut on ITV, appearing on a Formula One preview show for the new season. Later that year he was chosen over Gabby Logan to be the main presenter of ITV's coverage of the 2006 World Cup and remained in that role until Adrian Chiles's arrival as the channel's main football anchor in May 2010.

Following ITV's early withdrawal from its F1 contract, handing the coverage back to the BBC, it was announced on 24 November 2008, that Rider would not be offered a contract to return in 2009. The anchorman duties on BBC Sport were given to Jake Humphrey.

Rider started to present coverage of the British Touring Car Championship in 2009, which he still continues to do in 2022.

He was the main presenter of the Rugby World Cup 2011. This was his first major sports presenting role since anchoring the 2010 Champions League semi-final between Lyon and Bayern Munich.

Sky
In December 2011, it was announced that Rider had joined Sky Sports to present F1 Legends for Sky Sports F1; the channel debuted in March 2012.

Broadcasting style
On his style, he has said "[I'm not] that bothered about the environment that should surround a presenter at the beginning of a programme, of the "if we get you in this location it will look as though you are close to the action" sort of thing. That is meaningless for an audience, it is just a macho thing for a production team. We used to have these discussions: wouldn't it look great if you were standing by the 18th green as Nick Faldo putted out and you would say "No, that would get in the way of everybody's enjoyment of the event".

He has twice won the Royal Television Society's 'Sports Presenter of the Year' award, including in 1994, and won a BAFTA TV award for ITVs coverage of the 2008 F1 Brazilian Grand Prix. His defection to ITV was one of the most high-profile from BBC Sport since Des Lynam.

Personal life 
Rider married Jane Eydmann in November 1985 in Camden. The couple have two children, a son and daughter. The family live in Maidenhead, and have a second home in East Portlemouth, Devon. Rider had objected to the building of affordable housing within East Portlemouth, where property prices had soared due to wealthy second home owners, leaving local people unable to afford to live within their own communities. The objections were quashed by South Hams council.

In 2007, a birthday party held by Rider for his son Jack at Wycombe Air Park was disturbed when a canister of CS gas was set off.

Rider supports Charlton Athletic.

Charity interests
Rider is patron of the South Buckinghamshire charity Headway South Bucks, which raises money for people with head injuries, and also of children's cancer charity CLIC Sargent. He is also Vice-President of United Response, a national charity that supports people with learning disabilities, physical and mental health needs; and president of the North West Kent Addicks, an independent Charlton Athletic supporters group that raises money for local charities.

Rider has also become the patron of Children and Families Across Borders (CFAB), a charity dedicated to reuniting children who have been separated from their families. Since 2008 Rider has been the patron of Exeter Leukaemia Fund. In addition, Rider is Vice-President of the DEBRA Golf Society, which raises funds for individuals and families affected by epidermolysis bullosa (EB) – a painful genetic skin blistering condition which, in the worst cases, can be fatal.

References

External links 
 Steve Rider on itv.com

1950 births
Living people
BAFTA winners (people)
BBC sports presenters and reporters
English sports broadcasters
English television presenters
English motorsport people
Formula One journalists and reporters
People from Maidenhead
People from Dartford
English association football commentators
People educated at the John Roan School
Golf writers and broadcasters
Motorsport announcers
Beauty pageant hosts